Brazobán is a surname. Notable people with the surname include:

Huascar Brazobán (born 1989), Dominican baseball pitcher
Wason Brazobán (born 1969), Dominican musician and songwriter
Yhency Brazobán (born 1980), Dominican baseball pitcher